Salangsverket is a village and industrial site in Salangen Municipality in Troms, Norway.

References

Villages in Troms
Salangen
Mining communities in Norway